Uhunduni, also known as Damal (Damal-kal) and Amung (Amung-kal) after two of its dialects, is the language of the Amung people and Damal people. It is a Trans–New Guinea language that forms an independent branch of that family in the classification of Malcolm Ross (2005). However, it is treated as an isolate by Palmer (2018). This language family is also called Ingkipilu in a classification by Anton Moeliono. The word Damal came from the Dani people, while Uhunduni came from the Moni people.

Dialects are Amongme, Amung, Damal, Enggipilu.

Classification
Pawley and Hammarström (2018) do not consider there to be sufficient evidence for Uhunduni to be classified as part of Trans-New Guinea, though they do note the following lexical resemblances between Uhunduni and proto-Trans-New Guinea.

no- ‘eat’ < *na-
mo- come’ < *me-
mini- ‘sit’ < *mVna-
eme- ‘give’ < *mV-

Pronouns
Ross (2005) lists the pronouns as:

{| class="wikitable"
! !!singular!!dual!!plural
|-
!1
|na||iru||enoŋ
|-
!2
|a|| ||erop
|-
!3
|na|| ||nuŋ
|}

Iru is an inclusive dual.

Vocabulary
The following basic vocabulary words of Damal (Uhunduni) are from the Trans-New Guinea database, citing Voorhoeve (1975).

{| class="wikitable sortable"
! gloss !! Damal
|-
| head || niŋok
|-
| hair || niŋatok
|-
| eye || noŋop
|-
| tooth || naik
|-
| leg || dok; nok
|-
| louse || ma
|-
| dog || mitim
|-
| pig || bow
|-
| bird || elato; olem
|-
| egg || olemagam
|-
| blood || nimang
|-
| bone || dok; nok
|-
| skin || nigip
|-
| tree || em
|-
| man || me
|-
| sun || ul
|-
| water || o; uk; ut
|-
| fire || ka; kanelep
|-
| stone || kela
|-
| name || nem
|-
| eat || nowin
|-
| one || amenkak
|-
| two || au; u
|}

Literature
The New Testament in Damal was published in 1988.

Damal people and CMA. 1988. Haik-A Ongam Kal: Perjanjian Baru Dalam Bahasa Damal [Haik-A Ongam Kal: The New Testament in Damal]. Jakarta: Lembaga Alkitab Indonesia.

References

Amung–Dem languages
Languages of western New Guinea